Operation Cowboy was fought in the Czechoslovakian village of Hostau (now Hostouň, Czech Republic), on 28 April 1945, in the last days of fighting in the European Theater of World War II. It is one of two known incidents during the war in which Americans and Germans of the Wehrmacht fought side by side against the Waffen-SS, the other being the Battle of Castle Itter.

Background 

After the annexation of Austria to Nazi Germany in 1938, the Lipizzaner Breeding Mares of the Spanish Riding School in Vienna were transferred to an experimental farm in the village of Hostau, in Nazi-occupied Czechoslovakia. The goal was to create a race of "Aryan horses". The head of the Spanish Riding School, Alois Podhajsky, was a famed German horseman and dressage expert, and had been a bronze medallist at the 1936 Olympics. He had also been an Austrian Army officer, and by 1938 had been enrolled in the Wehrmacht with the rank of Major. In the final phases of World War II, Hostau was on the advancing path of the Soviet Red Army from the East, and the German soldiers in the farm were unenthusiastic about surrendering to the Russians. On the other side, to the West, the XII Corps of the American Third Army were also advancing toward the farm, commanded by General George Patton, racing with the Soviets for the liberation of Prague.

Prelude 

German veterinarians at the farm, commanded by Lieutenant Colonel Hubert Rudofsky, were scared about what the Russians could do to their horses, as during the liberation of Hungary they had already killed the whole Royal Hungarian Lipizzaner collection. Then Luftwaffe intelligence officer Lieutenant Colonel Walter Holters, not part of the farm personnel but forced there due to fuel shortage, tried to arrange an agreement with the advancing US troops. Holters, a general staff officer, was senior to Rudofsky but they agreed about the goal of saving the precious horses, and a contact was made with the nearest US unit in the area, the 42nd Cavalry Reconnaissance Squadron of the 2nd Cavalry Group. 2nd CG was famous for its daring deep strikes and was famed between German troops as "Ghosts of Patton's Army". In spite of being a mechanized unit, many of the officers of the Group were horsemen and had served in mounted units before the mechanization, so they immediately planned a rescue operation.

Furthermore, it seems that there was a meeting between Patton and Podhajsky, about a rescue operation of those horses, and for a source the meeting between Holters and Reed was not casual, but planned before 26 April. 

The operation was not simple for a series of factors. First, German troops at the Czech border were not part of the agreement and would likely oppose the American troops entering the area. Second, many of the hundreds of horses were pregnant and most of the rest had just given birth. Finally, Czechoslovakia had been posted in the Soviet area of influence during the Yalta Conference and the advancing Red Army would likely not have agreed with the operation, had they reached the farm in time.

Battle 

General Patton, who agreed to the operation, gave orders to quickly create a task force, but available troops were scarce. Assigned were two small cavalry reconnaissance troops with M8 scout cars, some M8 Howitzer Motor Carriages and two M24 Chaffee light tanks and a screening infantry force of 325 men; the task force being command by Major Robert P. Andrews. The path was 20 miles long, into still German-occupied territory with thousands of German troops, including two understrength armoured divisions; among them the 11th Panzer Division that a few days later would surrender at Passau.

After having passed German defences at the border, with the help of an artillery barrage by the XII Corps, Andrews secured the farm and was then confronted with the task of evacuating the horses. As the horses outnumbered the men in the task force, Andrews enrolled many Allied POWs – British, New Zealanders, French, Poles and Serbs – freed from concentration camps in the area. Furthermore he gave arms to the present German soldiers of the Heer and the Luftwaffe, even if they were formally prisoners of war. Finally he accepted the help of a Russian anticommunist Cossack Prince Amassov, who led a small force of Cossack cavalry that had deserted the German 1st Cossack Cavalry Division and was present in the area.

After arriving at the farm Colonel Reed looked for vehicles to move the pregnant horses and new-born foals. Meanwhile Major Andrews turned over the task force to his deputy, Captain Thomas M. Stewart. Before being able to evacuate the farm the composite force was attacked twice by Waffen-SS infantry, both being repelled with some dead and injured. The SS unit suffered more losses and eventually retreated. Immediately afterwards, Stewart managed to evacuate the horses, some mounted and the rest being herded, just before the first Soviet T-34 appeared in sight. The Soviets avoided any confrontation and the operation was concluded when all the horses were loaded into trucks near the border and secured behind American lines.

Legacy

Cultural 
The 1963 American adventure war film Miracle of the White Stallions released by Walt Disney, is loosely based on Operation Cowboy.

References 

1945 in Czechoslovakia
1945 in Germany
Germany in World War II
Battles of World War II involving Germany
Battles and operations of World War II involving the United States
Conflicts in 1945
Western European Campaign (1944–1945)
May 1945 events